Campbeltown Airport  is located at Machrihanish,  west of Campbeltown, near the tip of the Kintyre peninsula in Argyll and Bute on the west coast of Scotland. 
The airport was formerly known as RAF Machrihanish (after the village of Machrihanish) and hosted squadrons of the Royal Air Force and other NATO air forces as well as the United States Marine Corps.  The airport is at a strategic point near the Irish Sea, and was used to guard the entrance to the Firth of Clyde where US nuclear submarines were based at Holy Loch and where Royal Navy Trident missile submarines are still based at HMNB Clyde (Faslane Naval Base).

The United States Navy handed the airfield back to the MoD on 30 June 1995, marking the end of its service as a NATO facility since 1960. The airbase was sold to Machrihanish Airbase Community Company (MACC) in May 2012, and two thirds of the runway is leased to Highlands and Islands Airports for Campbeltown Airport.

At , the original runway 11/29 at Campbeltown Airport is the longest of any public airport in Scotland. It was built between 1960 and 1962 as part of a major reconstruction for the airport's role in NATO.

Campbeltown Aerodrome has a CAA Ordinary Licence (Number P808) that allows flights for the public transport of passengers or for flying instruction as authorised by the licensee (Highlands & Islands Airports Limited)

Airline and destination

Statistics

Incidents and accidents
On 15 March 2005, a Britten-Norman Islander air ambulance flying an approach into Campbeltown in low clouds crashed into the sea 7.7 miles from the Campbeltown airport, killing both occupants, the pilot and the paramedic. The air ambulance had been sent to Campbeltown to transport a patient to Glasgow for surgery.

References

External links
 http://www.hial.co.uk/campbeltown-airport/  Official website

Airports in Scotland
Transport in Argyll and Bute
Highlands and Islands Airports
Campbeltown